was a railway station in Engaru, Monbetsu, Hokkaido Prefecture, Japan. Its station number is A52.

Lines
Hokkaido Railway Company
Sekihoku Main Line

Adjacent stations

Railway stations in Hokkaido Prefecture
Railway stations in Japan opened in 1946
Railway stations closed in 2021